Sabyrtooth are an American rock duo composed of musicians Coley Carnegie and Abi Mae. The duo are strongly influenced by hard rock, grunge, heavy metal and punk. Their sound has been described as combining "ethereal, bittersweet vocals" with "visceral guitar riffs" and "blues-influenced drums".

Sabyrtooth was formed in fall, 2010, in Los Angeles, California, by Coley (drums and backing vocals) and Abi Mae (guitar and lead vocals). Sabyrtooth is both a production team and a band whose richly hypnotic sound is a result of the Carnegie's wide-ranging influences and expertise in music production.

History

2008–2010
Between 2008 and 2010, Sabyrtooth produced, engineered and starred in Alan Parsons's film series, the Art and Science of Sound Recording.

2010
Sabyrtooth collaborated with film producer Mike Fleiss (Hostel, Texas Chainsaw Massacre) on California Wildebeest's eponymously titled EP. The EP was subsequently debuted at Ozzfest 2010.

On August 23, 2010, Sabyrtooth's production, Lies, was featured on CBS television series, The Bachelor.

2012
In 2012, Sabyrtooth contributed to Douglass Richardson's album Colte Wolf, which was produced by Andy Johns (Led Zeppelin and Rolling Stones).

The duo that began in Los Angeles in 2010 has continued to create music together and describe their collaboration in Sabyrtooth as "raw and passion-fueled".

2012–2013 Sabyrtooth toured the United States, England and Scotland. The band also spent the latter half of 2013 extensively touring California. Traveling in their van from San Diego to San Francisco 6 or more times.

2015 Sabyrtooth released a single "Howl at the Moon" in memory of 8 year old Maddy Middleton a Santa Cruz child who was murdered by a local teen. The song was used to open Middleton's memorial at Kaiser Permanente Arena on August 3, 2015.

2016 The band performed live with friends Steel Panther at the Henry Fonda Theatre in Los Angeles, CA

2017 Founding of Carnegie Music Group, Los Angeles, CA

Musical style and influences
Sabyrtooth's sound involves elements of classic rock, folk and punk rock. The group cite their core influences as including ACDC, Metallica, Led Zeppelin, The Clash, David Bowie, Pantera and Guns N' Roses. The band also draws strong inspiration from 90's grunge bands Nirvana (band), Alice in Chains, and the Jesus and Mary Chain.

Early band manager Lizzie Ripps described their sound as "merging accessible pop-rock with a heavier, brooding edge" to create an "edgy, modern, and recklessly gratifying punk-folk hybrid". Mae's vocals have been described as similar to those of Courtney Love, Fiona Apple and Kim Deal.

Street Art & Fashion
Sabyrtooth is a street art duo producing work in graffiti style using wheat paste, stencils and stickers. They are well known for creating images of Queen Elizabeth, Darth Vadyr, Big Cats, Cobras and collaborating with artists Sheppard Fairey and renown graffiti legend Banksy.

The duo has been featured multiple times in Vice Magazine including journalistic pieces written by the band itself and their exploits while living in Malibu with Daryl Hannah.

Charity
Beginning in March 2016 the Carnegie's have donated all of the profits from Sabyrtooth's clothing line to charities committed to ending child and adult sexual abuse, and to supporting survivors in need of legal assistance, relocation, healthcare and counselling.

Members
Abi Mae was born in Oxford, England. She was the lead singer and bassist of all-girl punk band, Jade Banger. She is a proficient bass, guitar and piano player.

Mae's musical arrangement, "Special Guest", is featured in the film The Hammer, based on the life of UFC champion Matt Hamill. Abi Mae has previously collaborated with She & Him, Band of Horses, Rusty Anderson, Abe Laboriel, Jr., the Foo Fighters and Kris Kristofferson. Mae is one of a handful of female front-women who have performed at Ozzfest [music festival].

Coleman "Coley" Carnegie was born in Pittsburgh, Pennsylvania, United States. He has a background in  visual arts, namely painting, photography and graphic design. Carnegie was mentored by blues legend Duke Robillard from the age of 16. In the decade prior to forming Sabyrtooth, Carnegie worked as a producer, sound engineer for Alan Parsons and guitarist for Shooter Jennings & the 357's. Carnegie has toured with many bands including Jennings, Charlie Daniels Band, Kings X, Tony Hussle/Floetry and Marsha Ambrosius on Floetry's North American VH1 tour. In collaboration  with Scott Storch, Carnegie was a session musician (credited as "Coley Read" on guitar) on Paris Hilton’s album Paris. He cites Led Zeppelin/Rolling Stones producer Andy Johns and Alan Parsons as close friends and mentors.

Carnegie Family History

Coleman & Abigail Carnegie are the great-great-great grandson and daughter in law of industrial steel magnate Thomas M. Carnegie, and nephew/niece of Andrew Carnegie. They are associated with Cumberland Island National Seashore, the Carnegie family residence known for the private wedding of John F. Kennedy Jr and Carolyn Bessette-Kennedy as well as Skibo Castle in Scotland where Madonna and Guy Ritchie famously tied the knot.

Acting

As an actor and a musician Coley Carnegie has appeared on a number of television programs, including;
 Conan
 Last Call with Carson Daly
 The Late Late Show with Craig Ferguson
 Country Music Television: Shooter Jennings' Studio 330 Sessions
 VH1 Soul: Floetry Live in Manhattan.
 Disney Channel Original Series: Jonas L.A.

Discography

"Laugh Until I Die" (2018) Produced by Sabyrtooth & Andy Johns.

"The Dogs Are Out (feat. Alan Parsons)" Produced by Sabyrtooth & Alan Parsons (B-Side Rarity, 2012)

Tales from the Canterbury (2011), the group's first EP, was named after the Los Angeles apartment building the record was recorded in.

My Daydream (2010), was recorded at the request of skateboard film director, Jesse Shane Sanchez, who commissioned  Sabyrtooth to develop a musical score for the film My Daydream. The film starred members of the ZJ skateboarding house team, including Socrates Leal, Alec Beck, Marko Jazbinsek, Justin Cefai, Josue Campos and Mathew Leeb. The film was edited into a commercial for the Tech Deck fingerboard company.

References

External links
 Artsandscienceofsound.com
 "My Daydream" Skateboard video
 Gogonotes.blogspot.com
 ABC's Music Lounge
 Hamillthemovie.com

Indie rock musical groups from California
Musical groups from Los Angeles
Carnegie family